Vysoké Veselí is a town in Jičín District in the Hradec Králové Region of the Czech Republic. It has about 900 inhabitants.

Administrative parts
The village of Veselská Lhota is an administrative part of Vysoké Veselí.

Notable people
Friedrich Franz (1783–1860), mathematician and priest
Václav Šimerka (1819–1887), mathematician and priest

References

External links

Cities and towns in the Czech Republic
Populated places in Jičín District